Altice may refer to:

 Altice (company), a Netherlands-based multinational telecoms company
 Altice Dominicana S.A., a subsidiary operating in the Dominican Republic
 Altice Portugal, a subsidiary
 Altice USA, a former subsidiary of Altice that was spun-off as a separate company in 2019

People with the surname
 Summer Altice, an American fashion model and actress

See also 
 Altice Arena, Lisbon, Portugal
 Altice Studio, a television channel in France